The Hundreds of Derbyshire were the geographic divisions of the historic county of Derbyshire for administrative, military and judicial purposes. They were established in Derbyshire some time before the Norman conquest. In the Domesday Survey of 1086 AD the hundreds were called wapentakes. By 1273 the county was divided into 8 hundreds with some later combined, becoming 6 hundreds over the following centuries. The Local Government Act 1894 replaced hundreds with districts. Derbyshire is now divided into 8 administrative boroughs within the Derbyshire County Council area.

Domesday Book wapentakes 

In the Domesday Book, Derbyscire (Derbyshire) was divided into the 6 wapentakes of Apultre, Hamestan, Littlechirch, Morlestan, Scarvedale, and Walecross, and a district called Peche-fers (Peak Forest). 16 named tenants-in-chief and King's thanes were granted lands in the county. King William the Conqueror was tenant-in-chief for 130 lands including Ashbourne, Bakewell, Chesterfield, Derby and Matlock. Henry de Ferrers was the tenant-in-chief for 110 lands. William Peverel held 18 lands including Bolsover and Castleton.

Apultre 
45 places are named under the wapentake: Alkmonton, Ashe, Aston, Barton [Blount], Bentley, Boylestone, Bradley, Brailsford, Bupton, [Church] Broughton, Clifton, Doveridge, Eaton [Dovedale], Edlaston, Ednaston, Fenton, Foston, Great and Little Cubley, Hatton, Hilton, Hollington, Hoon, Hulland, Mapperley, Marston [-on-Dove], Marston [Montgomery]?, Norbury, Osleston, Osmaston, Rodsley, Roston, Sapperton, Scropton, Sedsall, Shirley, Snelston, Somersal, Sturston [Hall] and [Nether] Sturston, Sudbury, Sutton [-on-the-Hill], Thurvaston, Trusley?, Wyaston, Yeaveley, Yeldersley.

Hamestan 
45 places are named under the wapentake: Alsop [-en-le-Dale], Ashbourne, Atlow, Ballidon, Bonsall, Bradbourne, Brassington, Broadlowash, Callow, Carsington, [Cold] Eaton, Cowley, Cromford, Elton, [Fenny] Bentley, Hanson [Grange], Hartington, Hognaston, Hopton, Ible, Ivonbrook [Grange], [Kirk] Ireton, Kniveton, Lea, Ludwell, Mapleton, Matlock, Matlock [Bridge]?, Middleton, Newton [Grange], Offcote, Parwich, Pilsbury, Shottle, Snitterton, Soham, Tansley, Thorpe, Tissington, Wallstone, Welledene, Wensley, Werredune, Winster, Wirksworth.

71 other places are also named within the manor of Blackwell: Abney, Ashford [-in-the-Water], Aston, Bakewell, Bamford, Baslow, Beeley, Birchills, Birchover, Blackwell, Bradwell, Bubnell, Burley, Burton, Calver, Castleton, Charlesworth, Chatsworth, Chisworth and [Higher] Chisworth, Chunal, Conksbury, Cotes, Darley, Edale, Edensor, Eyam, Farley, Flagg, Gratton, [Great and Little] Hucklow, [Great] Longstone, Hadfield, Harthill, Hassop, Hathersage, Hayfield?, Hazelbadge, [Higher and Lower] Dinting, Holme, Hope, Kinder, Langley, [Little?] Longstone, Litton, Longdendale, Ludworth, Middleton, Monyash, Muchedeswelle, [Nether and Over] Haddon, [Nether and Upper] Hurst, Offerton, Old Glossop, One Ash, Padfield and [Little] Padfield, Pilsley, Priestcliffe, Rowland, Rowsley, Shatton, Sheldon, Stanton [-in-Peak], [Stoney] Middleton, Stoke, Taddington, Thornsett, Tideswell, Watrefeld, Whitfield, Wormhill, Youlgrave.

Littlechirch 
40 places are named under the Litchurch wapentake: Allestree, Alvaston, Ambaston, Arleston, Aston [-on-Trent], Barrow [-upon-Trent], Bearwardcote, Boulton, Burnaston, Chellaston, Cottons, Dalbury, Egginton, Elvaston, Etwall, Findern, Ireton, Kedleston, [Kirk] Langley, Litchurch, Littleover, Mackworth, Marsh?, Mercaston, Mickleover, Mugginton, Normanton, Osmaston, Potlocks, Quarndon, Radbourne, Shardlow, Sinfin, Stenson, Swarkestone, Thulston, Twyford, Weston [-on-Trent], Weston [Underwood], Willington.

Morlestan 
42 places are named under the wapentake: Bradley, Breadsall, Breaston, Cellesdene, Chaddesden, Codnor, Crich, Denby, Derby, Draycott, Duffield, Hallam, Heanor, Herdebi, Holbrook, Hopwell, Horsley, Ilkeston, Kidsleypark, Langley, [Little?] Hallam, [Little] Chester, [Little] Eaton, [Long] Eaton, Makeney, Markeaton, Milford, Morley, Ockbrook, Pentrich, Ripley, Risley, Sandiacre, Sawley, Shipley, Shuckstone, Smalley, Smithycote, Spondon, Stanley, Stanton [-by-Dale], Vlvritune.

Scarsdale 
71 places are named under the wapentake: Alfreton, Ashover, Barlborough, Barlow, Beighton, Blingsby, Bolsover, Boythorpe, Bramley [Vale], Brimington, Calow, Chesterfield, Clowne, [Coal] Aston, Dore, Dronfield, Duckmanton and [Long] Duckmanton, Eckington, Egstow, Elmton, Esnotrewic, Glapwell, [Great] Barlow, Greyhirst, Handley, Hardstoft, Holme, Holmesfield, Killamarsh, Lowne, [Middle, Nether and West] Handley, Morton, Morton, Mosborough, [Nether and Upper] Pilsley, Newbold and [Upper] Newbold, Newton, [North?] Wingfield, Norton and [Little] Norton, Ogston, [Old] Brampton, [Old] Tupton, [Old] Whittington, Owlcotes?, Padinc, Palterton, Rauenesholm, Rowthorne, Scarcliffe, Shirland, [South?] Wingfield, [South] Normanton, [Stony] Houghton, Stainsby, Staveley, Stretton, Sutton [Scarsdale], Tapton, [Temple] Normanton, Tibshelf, Totley, Tunstall, Ufton, Unstone, Upton, Wadshelf, Walton, Wessington, Whitwell, Williamthorpe, Wingerworth.

Walecross 
24 places are named under the wapentake: Appleby [Magna], Bolun, Bretby, Caldwell, Catton, Coton [-in-the-Elms], Drakelowe, Foremark, Hartshorne, Hearthcote, Ingleby, Lullington, Melbourne, Milton, Newton [Solney], Repton, Rosliston, Smisby, Stanton, Stanton [-by-Bridge], Stretton [-en-le-Field], Swadlincote, Ticknall, Walton [-on-Trent].

Medieval hundreds 

Over the centuries the 6 wapentakes became 8 and then 6 hundreds: Appletree, High Peak, Morleston and Litchurch, Reporton and Gresley, Scarsdale, and Wirksworth. The dates over which this process happened are not clear but they are recorded as 8 separate hundreds in the Hundred Roll of 1273 and, whilst some were combined, they continued until the late 19th century (as reported in Magna Britannia Volume 5 in 1817 and in The National Gazetteer of Great Britain and Ireland of 1868).

Appletree 
Recorded as Apeltre in 1273 and held by Edmund, Earl of Lancaster by grant from King Edward I. It was held by the Vernon aristocratic family on lease from the Duchy of Lancaster from 1660 until the 1800s.

Included the parishes of: Barton-Blount, Boylston, Bradley, Brailsford, Breadsall, Church-Broughton, Cubley, Dalbury, Doveridge, Duffield, Edlaston, Etwall, Kedleston, Longford, Marston-on-Dove, Norbury, Radborne, Scropton, Shirley, Somersall-Herbert, Spondon, Sudbury, Sutton-on-the-Hill, Trusley.

High Peak 
This hundred and Wirksworth hundred were formed from the old Hamestan wapentake and perhaps Peche-fers district in 1086. It was called Peck wapentake by 1273. In 1817 the Duke of Devonshire was leasing the High Peak hundred from the Duchy of Lancaster.

Included the parishes of: Bakewell, Castleton, Chapel-en-le-Frith, Edensor, Glossop, Hathersage, Hope, Tideswell, Eyam.

Morleston and Litchurch 
Morlestan or Morleystone wapentake and Littlechirch wapentake were separate in the Domesday Survey of 1086 and in the Hundred Roll of 1273. By 1300 they were combined as the hundred of Morleston and Litchurch.

Included the parishes of: Aston-on-Trent, Barrow, Breaston, Crich, Derby, Egginton, Elvaston, Heanor, Horsley, Ilkeston, Kirk-Hallam, Langley, Mackworth, Mickle-Over, Morley, Mugginton, Ockbrook, Pentrich, Sandiacre, Sawley, Stanton-by-Dale, Wellington, West-Hallam, Weston-on-Trent.

Repton and Gresley 
Formed from the earlier Domesday hundred of Walecross. In 1273 there were separate wapentakes of Repindon (held by Edmund, Earl of Lancaster by grant from King Edward I.) and Greselegh (owned by the heirs of the Earl of Chester respectively). In 1817 Sir Henry Crewe was lord of Repton and Gresley hundred.

Included the parishes of: Calke, Chellaston, Church-Gresley, Croxall, Hartshorn, Lullington, Melbourne, Ravenstone, Repton, Stanton-by-Bridge, Stapenhill, Stretton-in-the-Field, Walton-on-Trent, Willesley, Swarkston.

Scarsdale 
Known as Scarvedale wapentake from the Domesday Survey. In 1273 it belonged to Nicholas Lord Wake. In 1817 it was held by the Duke of Devonshire.

Included the parishes of: Alfreton, Ashover, Barlborough, Beighton, Blackwell, Bolsover, Chesterfield, Clown, Dronfield, Duckmanton, Eckington, Elmton, Halt-Hucknall, Heath, Langwith, Morton, North-Winfield, Norton, Pinxton, Pleasley, Scarcliffe, Shirland, South-Normanton, South-Winfield, Stavely, Sutton-in-the-Dale, Tibshelf, Whittington, Whitwell.

Wirksworth 
This hundred and High Peak hundred were formed from the old Hamestan wapentake. Recorded as Wyrkesworth in 1273 and still called a wapentake as late as 1817.

Included the parishes of: Ashborne, Bonsall, Bradborne, Carsington, Darley, Fenny-Bentley, Hartington, Kirk-Ireton, Kniveton, Mappleton, Matlock, Wirksworth, Thorp, Youlgrave.

See also 

 Derbyshire Domesday Books tenants-in-chief
 History of Derbyshire
 Hundreds in England

References 

History of Derbyshire
Derbyshire_Hundreds